Joseph Anthony Giorgio (September 27, 1923 – February 1, 2012) was an Italian-American actor and magician and known for his portrayal of Bruno Tattaglia in Francis Ford Coppola's 1972 film The Godfather.

Career

Giorgio was a prolific stage magician and card manipulator. He ran away from home at the age of 12 to join a circus and eventually performed at venues including conventions, fraternal clubs, country clubs, casinos, and film studios. He was hired by Playboy Clubs in the 1960s to be their resident gambling expert, and he gave paid lectures on the nature of confidence games and gambling scams. He was one of the first performers at The Magic Castle nightclub, winning Close-up Magician of the Year in the 1990s.

Giorgio acted in films such as The Godfather (1972), Black Gunn (1972), Magnum Force (1973), Foxy Brown (1974), Capone (1975), Escape to Witch Mountain (1975), The Sting II (1983), The Lonely Guy (1984), Night Train to Terror (1985) and American Me (1992). He also acted in numerous television programs including Mannix, Mission Impossible, Kojak, and The A-Team. In theatre, Giorgio originated the role of 'Big Julie' in the stage musical Guys and Dolls.

Death
On February 1, 2012, aged 88, Giorgio died of heart failure.

Filmography

Film 
 1966 A Big Hand for the Little Lady as "Steamboat" (uncredited)
 1968 Sol Madrid as Tall Man (uncredited)
 1968 The Wrecking Crew as Agent (uncredited)
 1969 Changes as Joe, Arcade Owner (uncredited)
 1969 Paint Your Wagon as Card Player (uncredited)
 1972 The Godfather as Bruno Tattaglia
 1972 Black Gunn as Ben
 1973 Harry in Your Pocket as 1st Detective
 1973 Magnum Force as Frank Palancio
 1974 Foxy Brown as Eddie
 1974 Adam-12 11/12/1974 as Bandit 
 1975 Escape to Witch Mountain as Hunter #2
 1975 Capone as Antonio "Tony The Scourge" Lombardo
 1978 Record City as Mr. F
 1983 The Sting II as Rossovich, Macalinski's Man
 1984 The Lonely Guy as Writer At Party
 1985 Night Train to Terror as Satan (segment "The Night Train") 
 1987 Cry Wilderness as The Sheriff 
 1992 American Me as Don Antonio Scagnelli
 1997 My Brother Jack as Rocco

Television 

 1967 Run for Your Life as Castro; 1 episode
 1967 Mannix as Sanford; 1 episode
 1968 The Monkees as Otto; 1 episode
 1968 The Outcasts as Card Dealer; 1 episode
 1969-1971 Mission: Impossible as Dealer / Foyer Guard / First Man / Meerghan / Croupier; 7 episodes
 1970 I Dream of Jeannie as Torpedo; 1 episode
 1971 The Doris Day Show as Ed, The Maître d'; 1 episode
 1971 Mission Impossible as Croupier; 1 episode
 1973 Jigsaw as Man; 1 episode
 1974 Marcus Welby, M.D. as Vito; 1 episode
 1974 Police Story as Cashier; 1 episode
 1974 The F.B.I. as M. Giorgio; 1 episode
 1975 Adam-12 as Michael Funicello; 1 episode
 1975 Emergency! as Lorenzo; 1 episode
 1975 Bronk as Killer; 1 episode
 1975 The Six Million Dollar Man as Abe Collins; 1 episode
 1975 Kojak as Bill Wilson; 1 episode
 1975 Switch as Bruno; 1 episode
 1976 The Bionic Woman as Aaron Creighton; 1 episode
 1978 Charlie's Angels as Carl; 1 episode
 1978 Columbo as Harry Parkman; 1 episode
 1980 Fantasy Island as Croupier; 1 episode
 1981 B. J. and the Bear as The Magician; 1 episode
 1981 Hart to Hart as Cheshire; 1 episode
 1982 Simon & Simon as Sam Boyle; 1 episode
 1984 Falcon Crest as Croupier; 1 episode
 1984 The A-Team as Mr. Carlin; 1 episode
 1985 Hunter as John Vincent; 1 episode
 1985 Moonlighting as Tony; 1 episode
 1986 Brothers as Mr. Santini; 1 episode
 2004 The Practice as Client #1; 1 episode (final appearance)

References

External links
 
 

American people of Italian descent
American male film actors
American male television actors
1923 births
2012 deaths
People from Herkimer, New York